Southern Region (formerly Papua Region) is one of four regions of Papua New Guinea. The region includes the national capital Port Moresby.

Subdivision
The Region is administratively divided into six provinces:

Central
Gulf
Milne Bay
Oro (Northern)
Western (Fly River)
National Capital District (Port Moresby)

See also
 Papua (disambiguation)
 Provinces of Papua New Guinea
 Territory of Papua
 Territory of Papua and New Guinea

References

 
Regions of Papua New Guinea